(born 18 March 1957 in Niigata, Japan) is a Japanese shōjo manga artist. She made her professional debut in 1977 in Bessatsu Shōjo Comic and she has written manga mainly for Flower Comics. She is best known for Makoto Call! about a girl who plays volleyball, for which she received the 1992 Shogakukan Manga Award for shōjo. In 2007, her  was dramatized on CTV in Taiwan as Romantic Princess.

Other series by her include Silver and Gold. Silver is a manga adaptation of a book by Penny Jordan, bearing the same title. Gold is based on Ann Major's novel, "Secret Child."

Works

Momoka Typhoon (1987-1989)
Makoto Call! (1990-1992)

References

External links
 
 Profile at The Ultimate Manga Guide

1957 births
Manga artists from Niigata Prefecture
Japanese female comics artists
Women manga artists
Female comics writers
Living people
20th-century Japanese women writers